Jean Theslöf (25 June 1884 – 30 March 1966) was a Finnish sports shooter and singer. He competed in four events at the 1924 Summer Olympics. In 1925 Theslöf moved to the United States. He was a baritone, and he founded a singing school in New York and recorded almost 60 songs during his career. Theslöf sometimes recorded under the pseudonym "Muhoksen Janne."

References

External links
 

1884 births
1966 deaths
Finnish male sport shooters
Olympic shooters of Finland
Shooters at the 1924 Summer Olympics
People from Oulu
American people of Finnish descent
20th-century Finnish male singers
Sportspeople from Oulu